The red-bellied fruit dove (Ptilinopus greyi) is a species of bird in the family Columbidae. It is found in lowland forest in New Caledonia, Santa Cruz Islands (Solomons), and Vanuatu, and it is common in most of its range.

The red-bellied fruit dove is overall green, but has a purplish-red crown and patch on the central belly. Adults of the two genders are very similar, although the belly patch is slightly smaller in the female. Juveniles essentially lack the pinkish-red patch on the belly and crown, leading to potential confusion with the Tanna fruit dove.

References

red-bellied fruit dove
Birds of Vanuatu
Birds of New Caledonia
Birds of the Solomon Islands
Birds of Melanesia
red-bellied fruit dove
red-bellied fruit dove
Taxonomy articles created by Polbot